Mark Korte (born August 2, 1996) is a professional Canadian football offensive lineman for the Edmonton Elks of the Canadian Football League (CFL).

University career
Korte played U Sports football for the Alberta Golden Bears from 2014 to 2017.

Professional career

Ottawa REDBLACKS
Korte was drafted by the Ottawa Redblacks in the first round with the fourth overall pick in the 2018 CFL Draft and signed with the team on May 16, 2018. He made the team's active roster following training camp and played in the team's season opener on June 21, 2018 against the Saskatchewan Roughriders. He re-signed with the Ottawa Redblacks on January 26, 2021.

Edmonton Elks

Korte signed with the Edmonton Elks to open free agency on February 8, 2022.

References

External links
Ottawa Redblacks bio

Living people
1996 births
Players of Canadian football from Alberta
People from Spruce Grove
Canadian football offensive linemen
Alberta Golden Bears football players
Ottawa Redblacks players